Ḳaus-malaka (Akkadian: 𒋡𒍑𒈠𒆷𒅗 Qauš-malaka; Edomite: 𐤒𐤅𐤎𐤌𐤋𐤊 Qāws-melek or Qāws-malāk) was the king of Udumi (Edom) during the reign of the Assyrian king Tiglath-Pileser III. His name can either mean "Qaus is king" (-melek) or "Qaus rules" (-malek).

References

Kings of Edom
7th-century BC people